Sun Heping is a Chinese diplomat served two times as Ambassador: to Nepal (2003–2007) and Uganda (2007–2011).

Biography
In September 2003 he succeeded  as Chinese Ambassador to Nepal, serving in that position from 2003 to 2007.

References

Living people
Ambassadors of China to Nepal
Ambassadors of China to Uganda
Year of birth missing (living people)